Minsk is the capital and the largest city of Belarus, located on the Svislach and the now subterranean Niamiha rivers. As the capital, Minsk has a special administrative status in Belarus and is the administrative centre of Minsk Region (voblast) and Minsk District (raion). As of January 2021, its population was 2 million, making Minsk the 11th most populous city in Europe. Minsk is one of the administrative capitals of the Commonwealth of Independent States (CIS) and the Eurasian Economic Union (EAEU).

First mentioned in 1067, Minsk became the capital of the Principality of Minsk before being annexed by the Grand Duchy of Lithuania in 1242. It received town privileges in 1499. From 1569, it was the capital of the Minsk Voivodeship, an administrative division of the Polish–Lithuanian Commonwealth. It was part of the territories annexed by the Russian Empire in 1793, as a consequence of the Second Partition of Poland. From 1919 to 1991, after the Russian Revolution, Minsk was the capital of the Byelorussian Soviet Socialist Republic, a republic of the Soviet Union. Following the dissolution of the Soviet Union, Minsk became the capital of the newly independent Republic of Belarus.

Etymology and historical names 

The Old East Slavic name of the town was Мѣньскъ (i.e. Měnsk < Early Proto-Slavic or Late Indo-European Mēnĭskŭ), derived from a river name Měn (< Mēnŭ). 
The resulting form of the name, Minsk (spelled either Минскъ or Мѣнскъ), was taken over both in Russian (modern spelling: Минск) and Polish (Mińsk), and under the influence of Russian this form also became official in Belarusian.  The direct continuation of the name in Belarusian is Miensk, which some Belarusian-speakers continue to use as their preferred name for the city.

When Belarus was under Polish rule, the names Mińsk Litewski ("Minsk of Lithuania") and Mińsk Białoruski ("Minsk of Belarus") were used to differentiate this place name from Mińsk Mazowiecki 'Minsk in Masovia'. In modern Polish, Mińsk without an attribute usually refers to the city in Belarus, which is about 50 times bigger than Mińsk Mazowiecki; (cf. Brest-Litovsk and Brześć Kujawski for a similar case).

History

Early history 

The area of today's Minsk was settled by Lithuanians in the 9th and 10th centuries AD. The Svislach River valley was the settlement boundary between two early East Slavic tribes – the Krivichs and Dregovichs. By 980, the area was incorporated into the early medieval Principality of Polotsk, one of the earliest East Slavic principalities of Kievan Rus'. Minsk was first mentioned in the name form Měneskъ (Мѣнескъ) in the Primary Chronicle for the year 1067 in association with the Battle on the River Nemiga. 1067 is now widely accepted as the founding year of Minsk. City authorities consider the date of 3 March 1067 to be the exact founding date of the city, though the town (by then fortified by wooden walls) had certainly existed for some time by then. The origin of the name is unknown but there are several theories.

In the early 12th century, the Principality of Polotsk disintegrated into smaller fiefs. The Principality of Minsk was established by one of the Polotsk dynasty princes. In 1129, the Principality of Minsk was annexed by Kiev, the dominant principality of Kievan Rus'; however in 1146 the Polotsk dynasty regained control of the principality. By 1150, Minsk rivalled Polotsk as the major city in the former Principality of Polotsk. The princes of Minsk and Polotsk were engaged in years of struggle trying to unite all lands previously under the rule of Polotsk.

Late Middle Ages 

Minsk escaped the Mongol invasion of Rus in 1237–1239. In 1242, Minsk became a part of the expanding Grand Duchy of Lithuania. It joined peacefully and local elites enjoyed high rank in the society of the Grand Duchy. In 1413, the Grand Duchy of Lithuania and Kingdom of Poland entered into a union. Minsk became the centre of Minsk Voivodship (province). In 1441, as Grand Duke of Lithuania, Casimir IV included Minsk in a list of cities enjoying certain privileges, and in 1499, during the reign of his son, Alexander I Jagiellon, Minsk received town privileges under Magdeburg law. In 1569, after the Union of Lublin, the Grand Duchy of Lithuania and the Kingdom of Poland merged into a single state, the Polish–Lithuanian Commonwealth.

By the middle of the 16th century, Minsk was an important economic and cultural centre in the Polish–Lithuanian Commonwealth. It was also an important centre for the Eastern Orthodox Church. Following the Union of Brest, both the Eastern Catholic Churches and the Roman Catholic Church increased in influence.

In 1655, Minsk was conquered by troops of Tsar Alexei of Russia. Russians governed the city until 1660 when it was regained by John II Casimir, Grand Duke of Lithuania and King of Poland. By the end of the Polish-Russian War, Minsk had only about 2,000 residents and just 300 houses. The second wave of devastation occurred during the Great Northern War, when Minsk was occupied in 1708 and 1709 by the army of Charles XII of Sweden and then by the army of Peter the Great.  The last decades of the Polish rule involved decline or very slow development, since Minsk had become a small provincial town of little economic or military significance.

Russian rule 

Minsk was annexed by Russia in 1793 as a consequence of the Second Partition of Poland. In 1796, it became the centre of the Minsk Governorate. All of the initial street names were replaced by Russian names, though the spelling of the city's name remained unchanged. It was briefly occupied by the Grande Armée during French invasion of Russia in 1812.

Throughout the 19th century, the city continued to grow and significantly improve. In the 1830s, major streets and squares of Minsk were cobbled and paved. A first public library was opened in 1836, and a fire brigade was put into operation in 1837. In 1838, the first local newspaper, Minskiye gubernskiye vedomosti ("Minsk province news") went into circulation. The first theatre was established in 1844. By 1860, Minsk was an important trading city with a population of 27,000. There was a construction boom that led to the building of 2 and 3-story brick and stone houses in Upper Town.

Minsk's development was boosted by improvements in transportation. In 1846, the Moscow-Warsaw road was laid through Minsk. In 1871, a railway link between Moscow and Warsaw ran via Minsk, and in 1873, a new railway from Romny in Ukraine to the Baltic Sea port of Libava (Liepāja) was also constructed. Thus Minsk became an important rail junction and a manufacturing hub. A municipal water supply was introduced in 1872, the telephone in 1890, the horse tram in 1892, and the first power generator in 1894. By 1900, Minsk had 58 factories employing 3,000 workers. The city also boasted theatres, cinemas, newspapers, schools and colleges, as well as numerous monasteries, churches, synagogues, and a mosque. According to the 1897 Russian census, the city had 91,494 inhabitants, with some 47,561 Jews constituting more than half of the city population.

20th century 

In the early years of the 20th century, Minsk was a major centre for the worker's movement in Belarus. The 1st Congress of the Russian Social Democratic Labour Party, the forerunner to the Bolsheviks and eventually the CPSU, was held there in 1898. It was also one of the major centres of the Belarusian national revival, alongside Vilnius. However, the First World War significantly affected the development of Minsk. By 1915, Minsk was a battlefront city. Some factories were closed down, and residents began evacuating to the east. Minsk became the headquarters of the Western Front of the Russian army and also housed military hospitals and military supply bases.

The Russian Revolution had an immediate effect in Minsk. A Workers' Soviet was established in Minsk in October 1917, drawing much of its support from disaffected soldiers and workers. After the Treaty of Brest-Litovsk, German forces occupied Minsk on 21 February 1918. On 25 March 1918, Minsk was proclaimed the capital of the Belarusian People's Republic. The republic was short-lived; in December 1918, Minsk was taken over by the Red Army. In January 1919 Minsk was proclaimed the capital of the Belorussian SSR, though later in 1919 (see Operation Minsk) and again in 1920, the city was controlled by the Second Polish Republic during the course of the Polish-Bolshevik War between 8 August 1919 and 11 July 1920 and again between 14 October 1920 and 19 March 1921. Under the terms of the Peace of Riga, Minsk was handed back to the Russian SFSR and became the capital of the Belorussian SSR, one of the founding republics of the Union of Soviet Socialist Republics.

A programme of reconstruction and development was begun in 1922. By 1924, there were 29 factories in operation; schools, museums, theatres and libraries were also established. Throughout the 1920s and the 1930s, Minsk saw rapid development with dozens of new factories being built and new schools, colleges, higher education establishments, hospitals, theatres and cinemas being opened. During this period, Minsk was also a centre for the development of Belarusian language and culture.

Before the Second World War, Minsk had a population of 300,000 people, but this had fallen to around 50,000 by 1944. The Germans captured Minsk in the Battle of Białystok–Minsk, as part of Operation Barbarossa; after it had been devastated by the Luftwaffe. However, some factories, museums, and tens of thousands of civilians had been evacuated to the east. The Germans designated Minsk the administrative centre of Generalbezirk Weißruthenien. Communists and sympathisers were killed or imprisoned, both locally and after being transported to Germany. Homes were requisitioned to house invading German forces. Thousands starved as food was seized by the German Army and paid work was scarce. Minsk was the site of one of the largest Nazi-run ghettos in the Second World War, temporarily housing over 100,000 Jews (see Minsk Ghetto). Some anti-Soviet residents of Minsk, who hoped that Belarus could regain independence, did support the Germans, especially at the beginning of the occupation, but by 1942, Minsk had become a major centre of the Soviet partisan resistance movement against the invasion, in what is known as the German-Soviet War. For this role, Minsk was awarded the title Hero City in 1974.

Minsk was recaptured by Soviet troops on 3 July 1944 in Minsk Offensive as part of Operation Bagration. The city was the centre of German resistance to the Soviet advance and saw heavy fighting during the first half of 1944. Factories, municipal buildings, power stations, bridges, most roads, and 80% of the houses were reduced to rubble. In 1944, Minsk's population was reduced to a mere 50,000.

The historical centre was replaced in the 1940s and 1950s by Stalinist architecture, which favoured grand buildings, broad avenues and wide squares. Subsequently, the city grew rapidly as a result of massive industrialisation. Since the 1960s Minsk's population has also grown apace, reaching 1 million in 1972 and 1.5 million in 1986.
Construction of Minsk Metro began on 16 June 1977, and the system was opened to the public on 30 June 1984, becoming the ninth metro system in the Soviet Union.
The rapid population growth was primarily driven by mass migration of young, unskilled workers from rural areas of Belarus, as well as by migration of skilled workers from other parts of the Soviet Union. To house the expanding population, Minsk spread beyond its historical boundaries. Its surrounding villages were absorbed and rebuilt as mikroraions, districts of high-density apartment housing.

Recent developments 

Throughout the 1990s, after the fall of Communism, the city continued to change. As the capital of a newly independent country, Minsk quickly acquired the attributes of a major city. Embassies were opened, and a number of Soviet administrative buildings became government centres. During the early and mid-1990s, Minsk was hit by an economic crisis and many development projects were halted, resulting in high unemployment and underemployment. Since the late 1990s, there have been improvements in transport and infrastructure, and a housing boom has been underway since 2002. On the outskirts of Minsk, new mikroraions of residential development have been built. Metro lines have been extended, and the road system (including the Minsk BeltWay) has been improved. In recent years Minsk has been continuously decentralizing, with a third line of the Minsk Metro opening in 2020. More development is planned for several areas outside the city centre, while the future of the older neighborhoods is still unclear.

Geography 

Minsk is located on the southeastern slope of the Minsk Hills, a region of rolling hills running from the southwest (upper reaches of the river Nioman) to the northeast– that is, to Lukomskaye Lake in northwestern Belarus. The physical geography of Minsk was shaped over the two most recent ice ages. The Svislach River, which flows across the city from the northwest to the southeast, is in the urstromtal, an ancient river valley formed by water flowing from melting ice sheets at the end of the last Ice Age. There are six smaller rivers within the city limits, all part of the Black Sea basin.

Minsk is in the area of mixed forests typical of most of Belarus. Pinewood and mixed forests border the edge of the city, especially in the north and east. Some of the forests were preserved as parks (for instance, the Chelyuskinites Park) as the city grew.

The city was initially built on the hills, which allowed for defensive fortifications, and the western parts of the city are the most hilly.

In 5 km from the northwestern edge of city lies large Zaslawskaye reservoir, often called the Minsk sea. It is the second largest reservoir in Belarus, constructed in 1956.

Climate 
Minsk has a warm summer humid continental climate (Köppen Dfb) though unpredictable many a times, owing to its location between the strong influence of the moist air of the Atlantic Ocean and the dry air of the Eurasian landmass. Its weather is unstable and tends to change relatively often. Fog is frequent, especially in the autumn and spring. Throughout the year, most winds are westerly and northwesterly, bringing cool and moist air from the Atlantic.

Ecological situation 
The ecological situation is monitored by Republican Centre of Radioactive and Environmental Control.
 During 2003–2008 the overall weight of contaminants increased from 186,000 to 247,400 tons. The change from gas as industrial fuel to mazut for financial reasons has worsened the ecological situation. However, the majority of overall air pollution is produced by cars. Belarusian traffic police DAI every year hold operation "Clean Air" to prevent the use of cars with extremely polluting engines. Sometimes the maximum normative concentration of formaldehyde and ammonia in air is exceeded in Zavodski District. Other major contaminants are Chromium-VI and nitrogen dioxide. Zavodski, Partyzanski and Leninski districts, which are located in the southeastern part of Minsk, are the most polluted areas in the city.

Demographics

Population growth

Ethnic groups 
During its first centuries, Minsk was a city with a predominantly Early East Slavic population (the forefathers of modern-day Belarusians). After the 1569 Polish–Lithuanian union, the city became a destination for migrating Poles (who worked as administrators, clergy, teachers and soldiers) and Jews (Ashkenazim, who worked in the retail trade and as craftsmen, as other opportunities were prohibited by discrimination laws). During the last centuries of the Polish–Lithuanian Commonwealth, many Minsk residents became polonised, adopting the language of the dominant Poles and assimilating to its culture.

After the second partition of Poland-Lithuania in 1793, Minsk and its larger region became part of the Russian Empire. The Russians dominated the city's culture as had the Poles in the earlier centuries.

At the time of the 1897 census under the Russian Empire, Jews were the largest ethnic group in Minsk, at 52% of the population, with 47,500 of the 91,000 residents. Other substantial ethnic groups were Russians (25.5%), Poles (11.4%) and Belarusians (9%). The latter figure may be not accurate, as some local Belarusians were likely counted as Russians. A small traditional community of Lipka Tatars had been living in Minsk for centuries.

Between the 1880s and 1930s, many Jews, as well as peasants from other backgrounds, emigrated from the city to the United States as part of a Belarusian diaspora.

The high mortality of the First World War and the Second World War affected the demographics of the city, particularly the destruction of Jews under the Nazi occupation of the Second World War. Working through local populations, Germans instituted deportation of Jewish citizens to concentration camps, murdering most of them there. The Jewish community of Minsk suffered catastrophic losses in the Holocaust. From more than half the population of the city, the percentage of Jews dropped to less than 10% more than ten years after the war. After its limited population peaked in the 1970s, continuing anti-Semitism under the Soviet Union and increasing nationalism in Belarus caused most Jews to emigrate to Israel and western countries in the 1980s; by 1999, less than 1% of the population of Minsk was Jewish.

In the first three decades of the post-war years, the most numerous new residents in Minsk were rural migrants from other parts of Belarus; the proportion of ethnic Belarusians increased markedly. Numerous skilled Russians and other migrants from other parts of the Soviet Union migrated for jobs in the growing manufacturing sector. In 1959 Belarusians made up 63.3% of the city's residents. Other ethnic groups included Russians (22.8%), Jews (7.8%), Ukrainians (3.6%), Poles (1.1%) and Tatars (0.4%). Continued migration from rural Belarus in the 1960s and 1970s changed the ethnic composition further. By 1979 Belarusians made up 68.4% of the city's residents. Other ethnic groups included Russians (22.2%), Jews (3.4%), Ukrainians (3.4%), Poles (1.2%) and Tatars (0.2%).

According to the 1989 census, 82% percent of Minsk residents have been born in Belarus. Of those, 43% have been born in Minsk and 39% – in other parts of Belarus. 6.2% of Minsk residents came from regions of western Belarus (Grodno and Brest Regions) and 13% – from eastern Belarus (Mogilev, Vitebsk and Gomel Regions). 21.4% of residents came from central Belarus (Minsk Region).

According to the 1999 census, Belarusians make up 79.3% of the city's residents. Other ethnic groups include Russians (15.7%), Ukrainians (2.4%), Poles (1.1%) and Jews (0.6%). The Russian and Ukrainian populations of Minsk peaked in the late 1980s (at 325,000 and 55,000 respectively). After the break-up of the Soviet Union many of them chose to move to their respective mother countries, although some families had been in Minsk for generations. Another factor in the shifting demographics of the city was the changing self-identification of Minsk residents of mixed ancestry – in independent Belarus they identify as Belarusians.

The Jewish population of Minsk peaked in the early 1970s at 50,000 according to official figures; independent estimates put the figure at between 100,000 and 120,000. Beginning in the 1980s, there has been mass-scale emigration to Israel, the US, and Germany. Today only about 10,000 Jews live in Minsk. The traditional minorities of Poles and Tatars have remained at much the same size (17,000 and 3,000 respectively). Rural Poles have migrated from the western part of Belarus to Minsk, and many Tatars have moved to Minsk from Tatarstan.

Some more recent ethnic minority communities have developed as a result of immigration. The most prominent are immigrants from the Caucasus countries – Armenians, Azerbaijanis and Georgians each numbering about 2,000 to 5,000. They began migrating to Minsk in the 1970s, and more immigrants have joined them since. Many work in the retail trade in open-air markets. A small but prominent Arab community has developed in Minsk, primarily represented by recent economic immigrants from Syria, Lebanon, Egypt, Algeria, etc. (In many cases, they are graduates of Minsk universities who decide to settle in Belarus and bring over their families). A small community of Romani, numbering about 2,000, are settled in suburbs of north-western and southern Minsk.

Languages 

Throughout its history Minsk has been a city of many languages. Initially most of its residents spoke Ruthenian (which later developed into modern Belarusian). However, after 1569 the official language was Polish. In the 19th-century Russian became the official language and by the end of that century it had become the language of administration, schools and newspapers. The Belarusian national revival increased interest in the Belarusian language – its use has grown since the 1890s, especially among the intelligentsia. In the 1920s and early 1930s Belarusian was the major language of Minsk, including use for administration and education (both secondary and tertiary). However, since the late 1930s Russian again began gaining dominance.

A short period of Belarusian national revival in the early 1990s saw a rise in the numbers of Belarusian speakers. However, in 1994 the newly elected president Alexander Lukashenko slowly reversed this trend. Most residents of Minsk now use Russian exclusively in their everyday lives at home and at work, although Belarusian is understood as well. Substantial numbers of recent migrants from the rural areas use Trasyanka (a Russo-Belarusian mixed language) in their everyday lives.

Religion 
There are no reliable statistics on the religious affiliations of those living in Minsk, or among the population of Belarus generally. The majority of Christians belong to the Belarusian Orthodox Church, which is the exarchate of the Russian Orthodox Church in Belarus. There is a significant minority of Roman Catholics.

As of 2006, there are approximately 30 religious communities of various denominations in Minsk.  The only functioning monastery in the city is St Elisabeth Convent; its large complex of churches is open to visitors.

Crime 

Minsk has the highest crime rate in Belarus – 193.5 crimes per 10,000 citizens. 20–25% of all serious crimes in Belarus, 55% of bribes and 67% of mobile phone thefts are committed in Minsk. However, attorney general Grigory Vasilevich stated that the homicide rate in Minsk in 2008 was "relatively fine".

The crime rate grew significantly in 2009 and 2010: for example, the number of corruption crimes grew by 36% in 2009 alone. Crime detection level varies from 13% in burglary to 92% in homicide with an average 40.1%. Many citizens are concerned for their safety at night and the strongest concern was expressed by residents of Chizhovka and Shabany microdistricts (both in Zavodski District).

The SIZO-1 detention center, IK-1 general prison, and the KGB special jail called "Amerikanka" are all located in Minsk. Alexander Lukashenko's rivals in the 2010 presidential election were imprisoned in the KGB jail along with other prominent politicians and civil activists. Ales Michalevic, who was kept in this jail, accused the KGB of using torture.

On 15 November 2020, more than 1,000 protesters were arrested during an anti-government protest. Protesters took to the streets in the capital, Minsk, following the death of an opposition activist, Roman Bondarenko. The activist died after allegedly being beaten up by the security forces. The protesters put flowers at the site where he was detained before succumbing to his injuries.

Economy 

Minsk is the economic capital of Belarus. It has developed industrial and services sectors which serve the needs not only of the city, but of the entire nation. Minsk's contributions form nearly 46% of Belarusian budget. According to 2010 results, Minsk paid 15 trillion BYR to state budget while the whole income from all other regions was 20 trillion BYR. In the period January 2013 to October 2013, 70.6% of taxes in the budget of Minsk were paid by non-state enterprises, 26.3% by state enterprises, and 1.8% by individual entrepreneurs. Among the top 10 taxpayers were five oil and gas companies (including two Gazprom's and one Lukoil's subsidiaries), two mobile network operators (MTS and A1), two companies producing alcoholic beverages (Minsk-Kristall and Minsk grape wines factory) and one producer of tobacco goods.

In 2012, Gross Regional Product of Minsk was formed mainly by industry (26.4%), wholesale (19.9%), transportation and communications (12.3%), retail (8.6%) and construction (5.8%).

GRP of Minsk measured in Belarusian rubles was 55 billion(€20 billion) or around 1/3 of Gross domestic product of Belarus.

Minsk city has highest salaries in Belarus. As of July 2022 average gross salary in Minsk was 2,265 BYN per month or around €900 per month.

Industry 

Minsk is the major industrial centre of Belarus. According to 2012 statistics, Minsk-based companies produced 21.5% of electricity, 76% of trucks, 15.9% of footwear, 89.3% of television sets, 99.3% of washing machines, 30% of chocolate, 27.7% of distilled alcoholic beverages and 19.7% of tobacco goods in Belarus.

Today the city has over 250 factories and plants. Its industrial development started in the 1860s and was facilitated by the railways built in the 1870s. However, much of the industrial infrastructure was destroyed during World War I, especially during World War II. After the last war, the development of the city was linked to the development of industry, especially of R&D-intensive sectors (heavy emphasis of R&D intensive industries in urban development in the USSR is known in Western geography as 'Minsk phenomenon'). Minsk was turned into a major production site for trucks, tractors, gears, optical equipment, refrigerators, television sets and radios, bicycles, motorcycles, watches, and metal-processing equipment. Outside machine-building and electronics, Minsk also had textiles, construction materials, food processing, and printing industries. During the Soviet period, the development of the industries was linked to suppliers and markets within the USSR. The break-up of the union in 1991 led to a serious economic meltdown in 1991–1994.

However, since the adoption of the neo-Keynesean policies under Alexander Lukashenko's government in 1995, much of the gross industrial production was regained. Unlike many other cities in the CIS and Eastern Europe, Minsk was not heavily de-industrialised in the 1990s. About 40% of the workforce is still employed in the manufacturing sector.

Major industrial employers include:
Minsk Tractor Plant – specialised in manufacturing tractors. Established in 1946 in eastern Minsk, is among major manufacturers of wheeled tractors in the CIS. Employs about 30,000 staff.
Minsk Automobile Plant – specialising in producing trucks, buses, and mini-vans. Established in 1944 in south-eastern Minsk, is among major vehicle manufacturers in the CIS.
Minsk Refrigerator Plant (also known as Atlant) – specialised in manufacturing household goods, such as refrigerators, freezers, and recently also of washing machines. Established in 1959 in the north-west of the city.
Horizont – specialised in producing TV-sets, audio and video electronics. Established in 1950 in north-central Minsk.

Unemployment 
In 2011 official statistics quote unemployment in Minsk at 0.3%. During the 2009 census 5.6% of Minsk residents of employable age called themselves unemployed.
The government discourages official unemployment registration with tiny unemployment benefits and obligatory public works. Until 2018 there was an 'unemployment tax' taken from those who were suspected of loitering.

Government and administrative divisions 

Minsk is subdivided into nine raions (districts):
 
 
 
 
 
 
 
 
 

In addition, a number of residential neighbourhoods are recognised in Minsk, called microdistricts, with no separate administration.

Culture 

Minsk is the major cultural center of Belarus. Its first theatres and libraries were established in the middle of the 19th century. Now it has 11 theatres and 16 museums. There are 20 cinemas and 139 libraries.

Churches 
The Orthodox Cathedral of the Holy Spirit is actually the former church of the Bernardine convent. It was built in the simplified Baroque style in 1642–87 and went through renovations in 1741–46 and 1869.
The Cathedral of Saint Mary was built by the Jesuits as their principal church in 1700–10, restored in 1951 and 1997; it overlooks the recently restored 18th-century city hall, located on the other side of the Liberty Square;
Two other historic churches are the cathedral of Saint Joseph, formerly affiliated with the Bernardine monastery, built in 1644–52 and repaired in 1983, and the fortified church of Sts. Peter and Paul, originally built in the 1620s and recently restored, complete with its flanking twin towers.
The impressive Neo-Romanesque Roman Catholic Red Church (Cathedral of Sts. Simeon and Helene) was built in 1906–10 immediately after religious freedoms were proclaimed in Imperial Russia and the tsar allowed dissidents to build their churches;
The largest church built in the Russian imperial period of the town's history is dedicated to St. Mary Magdalene;
Many Orthodox churches were built after the dissolution of the USSR in a variety of styles, although most remain true to the Neo-Russian idiom. A good example is St. Elisabeth's Convent, founded in 1999.

Cemeteries 
Kalvaryja (Calvary Cemetery) is the oldest surviving cemetery in the city. Many famous people of Belarus are buried here. The cemetery was closed to new burials in the 1960s.
Military Cemetery
Eastern Cemetery
Čyžoŭskija Cemetery
Northern Cemetery

Theatres 
Major theatres are:
National Academic Grand Opera and Ballet Theatre of the Republic of Belarus 
 Belarusian State Musical Theatre (performances in Russian)
Maxim Gorky National Drama Theatre (performances in Russian)
Janka Kupala National Theatre (performances in Belarusian)

Museums 
Major museums include:
Belarusian National Arts Museum
Belarusian Great Patriotic War Museum
Belarusian National History and Culture Museum
Belarusian Nature and Environment Museum
Maksim Bahdanovič Literary Museum
Old Belarusian History Museum

Art galleries include:
Ў gallery

Recreation areas 
Chelyuskinites Park
Children's Railroad
Gorky Park (Minsk)
Yanka Kupala Park

Tourism 
There are more than 400 travel agencies in Minsk, about a quarter of them provide agent activity, and most of them are tour operators.

Sports

Football 
FC Dinamo Minsk
FC Minsk
FC Energetik-BGU Minsk
FC Krumkachy Minsk

Ice hockey 
HC Dinamo Minsk
HC Yunost Minsk

Handball 
SKA Minsk

Basketball 
BC Tsmoki-Minsk

International sporting events 

In 2013, Minsk hosted the European Junior Rowing Championships at the Republican Center of Olympic Training for Rowing And Canoeing to the north-west of the city.

Minsk hosted the 2014 IIHF World Championship at the Minsk Arena.

In January 2016, the 2016 European Speed Skating Championships were held in the Minsk Arena. Minsk Arena is the only indoor speed skating rink in Belarus.

Minsk hosted the 2019 European Games in June.

The 2019 European Figure Skating Championships were held in the Minsk Arena from the 21 to 27 January.

Transportation

Local transport 
Minsk has an extensive public transport system. Passengers are served by 8 tramway lines, over 70 trolleybus lines, 3 subway lines and over 100 bus lines. Trams were the first public transport used in Minsk (since 1892 – the horse-tram, and since 1929 – the electric tram). Public buses have been used in Minsk since 1924, and trolleybuses since 1952.

All public transport is operated by Minsktrans, a government-owned and -funded transport not-for-profit company. As of November 2021, Minsktrans used 1,322 buses (plus 93 electric buses), 744 trolleybuses and 135 tramway cars in Minsk.

The Minsk city government in 2003 decreed that local transport provision should be set at a minimum level of 1 vehicle (bus, trolleybus or tram) per 1,500 residents. The number of vehicles in use by Minsktrans is 2.2 times higher than the minimum level. 

Public transport fares are controlled by the city's executive committee (city council). Single trip ticket for bus, trolleybus or tramway costs 0.75 BYN (≈ USD 0.3), 0.80 BYN for metro and 0.90 BYN for express buses. Monthly ticket for one kind of transport costs 33 BYN and 61 BYN for all five. Commercial marshrutka's prices varies from 1.5 to 2 BYN.

Rapid transit 

Minsk is the only city in Belarus with an underground metro system. Construction of the metro began in 1977, soon after the city reached over a million people, and the first line with 8 stations was opened in 1984. On 7 November 2012, three new stations on the Moskovskaya Line were opened and another on 3 June 2014.. Construction of the third line began in 2011 and the first stage opened in 2020. Some layout plans speculate on a possible fourth line running from Vyasnyanka to Serabranka micro-rayons.

Trains use 243 standard Russian metro-cars. On a typical day Minsk metro is used by 800,000 passengers. In 2007 ridership of Minsk metro was 262.1 million passengers, in 2017 ridership of Minsk metro was 284,1 million passengers,
making it the 5th busiest metro network in the former USSR (behind Moscow, St. Petersburg, Kyiv and Kharkiv). During peak hours trains run each 2–2.5 minutes. The metro network employs 3,200 staff.

Most of the urban transport is being renovated to modern standards. For instance, all metro stations built since 2001 have passenger lifts from platform to street level, thus enabling the use of the newer stations by disabled passengers.

Railway and intercity bus 

Minsk is the largest transport hub in Belarus. Minsk is located at the junction of the Warsaw-Moscow railway (built in 1871) running from the southwest to the northeast of the city and the Liepaja-Romny railway (built in 1873) running from the northwest to the south. The first railway connects Russia with Poland and Germany; the second connects Ukraine with Lithuania and Latvia. They cross at the Minsk-Pasažyrski railway station, the main railway station of Minsk. The station was built in 1873 as Vilenski vakzal. The initial wooden building was demolished in 1890 and rebuilt in stone. During World War II the Minsk railway station was completely destroyed. It was rebuilt in 1945 and 1946 and served until 1991. The new building of the Minsk-Pasažyrski railway station was built during 1991–2002. Its construction was delayed due to financial difficulties; now, however, Minsk boasts one of the most modern and up-to-date railway stations in the CIS. There are plans to move all suburban rail traffic from Minsk-Pasažyrski to the smaller stations, Minsk-
Uschodni (East), Minsk-Paŭdniovy (South) and Minsk-Paŭnočny (North), by 2020.

There are three intercity bus stations that link Minsk with the suburbs and other cities in Belarus and the neighboring countries. There are frequent services to Moscow, Smolensk, Vilnius, Riga, Kyiv and Warsaw.

Cycling 
According to the 2019 survey of 1934 people, Minsk had around 811,000 adult bicycles and 232,000 child and adolescent bicycles. In Minsk there is one bike for every 1.9 people. The total number of bicycles in Minsk exceeds the total number of cars (770,000 personal automobiles). 39% of Minsk residents have a personal bike. 43% of Minsk residents ride a bicycle once a month or more. As of 2017, the level of bicycle use is about 1% of all transport movements (for comparison: 12% in Berlin, 50% in Copenhagen).

Since 2015, an annual bicycle parade / bicycle carnival is held in Minsk, during which vehicles are blocked for several hours along Pobediteley (Peramohi) Avenue. The number of participants in 2019 was more than 20,000 and the number of registrations was about 12,000. In 2017, the European Union funded the project "Urban cycling in Belarus" at a cost of €560,000, within the framework of which the public association Minsk Cycling Society together with the Council of Ministers created the regulatory document National Concept for the Development of Cycling in Belarus. In 2020, Minsk entered the top 3 most cycling cities in the CIS – after Moscow and Saint Petersburg.

Airports 

It opened in 1982 and the current railway station opened in 1987. It is an international airport with flights to Europe and the Middle East.

Prior to 1982, the main airport was Minsk-1 Airport, opened in 1933 a few kilometres to the south of the historical centre. In 1955 it became an international airport and by 1970 served over 1 million passengers a year. After 1982, it mainly served domestic routes in Belarus and short-haul routes to Moscow, Kyiv and Kaliningrad. Minsk-1 was closed in December 2015 because of the noise pollution in the surrounding residential areas. The land of the airport is currently being redeveloped for residential and commercial real estate, branded as Minsk-City, as well as the new Zelenaluzhskaya line of the Minsk Metro.

Minsk Borovaya Airfield (UMMB) is located in a suburb north-east of the city, next to Zaliony Luh Forest Park, housing Aero Club Minsk and Minsk Aviation Museum.

Education 
Minsk has about 451 kindergartens, 241 schools, 22 further education colleges, and 29 higher education institutions, including 12 major national universities.

Major higher educational institutions 

Academy of Public Administration under the aegis of the President of the Republic of Belarus. The Academy was established in 1991 and it acquired the status of a presidential institution in 1995. The Academy has 3 institutes: Institute of Administrative Personnel which has 3 departments, Institute of Civil Service which has 3 departments and Research Institute of the Theory and Practice of Public administration.
Belarusian State University. Major Belarusian universal university, founded in 1921. In 2006 had 15 major departments (Applied Mathematics and Informatics; Biology; Chemistry; Geography; Economics; International relations; Journalism; History; Humanitarian Sciences; Law; Mechanics and Mathematics; Philology; Philosophy and Social sciences; Physics; Radiophysics and Electronics). It also included 5 R&D institutes, 24 Research Centres, 114 R&D laboratories. The University employs over 2,400 lecturers and 1,000 research fellows; 1,900 of these hold PhD or Dr. Sc. degrees. There are 16,000 undergraduate students at the university, as well as over 700 PhD students. In 2018 Olga Chupris was the first female Vice-Rector appointed to the institution (Academic Work and Educational Innovations).
Research Institute for Nuclear Problems of Belarusian State University
Belarusian State University of Agricultural Technology. Specialised in agricultural technology and agricultural machinery.
Belarusian National Technical University. Specialised in technical disciplines.
Belarusian State Medical University. Specialised in Medicine and Dentistry. Since 1921 – Medicine Department of the Belarusian State University. In 1930 becomes separate as Belarusian Medical Institute. In 2000 upgraded to university level. Has six departments.
Belarusian State Economic University. Specialised in Finance and Economics. Founded in 1933 as Belarusian Institute for National Economy. Upgraded to university level in 1992.
Maxim Tank Belarusian State Pedagogical University. Specialised in teacher training for secondary schools.
Belarusian State University of Informatics and Radioelectronics. Specialised in IT and radioelectronic technologies. Established in 1964 as Minsk Institute for Radioelectronics.
Belarusian State University of Physical Training. Specialised in sports, coaches and PT teachers training.
Belarusian State Technological University. Specialised in chemical and pharmaceutical technology, in printing and forestry. Founded in 1930 as Forestry Institute in Homel. In 1941 evacuated to Sverdlovsk, now Yekaterinburg. Returned to Gomel in 1944, but in 1946 relocated to Minsk as Belarusian Institute of Technology. Upgraded to university level in 1993. Has nine departments.
Minsk State Linguistic University. Specialised in foreign languages. Founded in 1948 as Minsk Institute for Foreign Languages. In 2006 had 8 departments. Major focus on English, French, German and Spanish.
Belarusian State University of Culture and Arts. Specializes in cultural studies, visual and Performing Arts. Founded in 1975 as Minsk Institute of Culture. Reorganized in 1993.
International Sakharov Environmental Institute. Specialised in environmental sciences. Established in 1992 with the support from the United Nations. Focus on study and research of radio-ecological consequences of the Chernobyl nuclear power station disaster in 1986, which heavily affected Belarus.
Minsk Institute of Management. The largest private higher educational institution in Belarus. Established in 1991. Specializes in Economics, Management, Marketing, Finance, Psychology and Information technology.

Honors 
A minor planet 3012 Minsk discovered by Soviet astronomer Nikolai Chernykh in 1979 is named after the city.

Notable residents 

Andrei Pavlovich Ablameyko (born 1970) Belarusian Greek Catholic priest
Anton Adamovič (1909 -1998), literary critic, novelist, publicist and historian
 Viktar Babaryka (born 1963), Belarusian public and opposition political figure, political prisoner
 Maksim Bahdanovič (1891 – 1917), poet, considered one of the founders of modern Belarusian literature
Raman Bandarenka (1989–2020), designer killed during the protests against the 2020 Belarusian presidential election
Masha Bruskina (1924–1941) World War II partisan
 Veronika Cherkasova (1959 – 2004), journalist 
  Illia Chrenaǔ (nom de guerre "Litvin") (1994 – 2022), Belarusian volunteer killed in action defending Ukraine during the 2022 Russian invasion 
Olga Chupris (born 1969) first female Vice Rector of the Belarusian State University
Avraham Even-Shoshan (1906–1984), Israeli linguist and lexicographer
Sophie Fedorovitch (1893–1953) ballet, opera and theatre designer, birthplace
Ella German (born 1937), girlfriend of Lee Harvey Oswald
Moisei Ginzburg (1892–1946) constructivist architect
Gennady Grushevoy (1950-2014) academic, politician, human rights and environmental activist, winner of the 1999 Rafto Prize
 Alés Harun (1887 – 1920), poet, writer and journalist
 Anatol Hrytskievich (1929 – 2015), Belarusian historian
 Hienadź Karpienka (1949 – 1999), scientist and politician
 Uładzimir Katkoŭski (1976 – 2007), one of the founders of the Belarusian Wikipedia
 Jauhien Kulik (1937 - 2002), artist and graphic designer who designed the 1991-95 Coat of Arms of Belarus, which was a version of the medieval symbol Pahonia
 Pavel Latushka (b.1973), Belarusian politician and opposition leader
Maryna Linchuk (born 1987) fashion model
Ivan Lubennikov (born 1951) Russian painter, birthplace
 Janka Lučyna (Jan Niesłuchowski (1851 – 1897), poet
 Leanid Marakou (1958 – 2016), journalist, writer
 Valery Marakoǔ (1909 – 1937), Belarusian poet and translator, victim of Stalin’s purges 
 Yan Matusevich (1946 – 1998) Catholic priest, and dean of the Belarusian Greek Catholic Church
Louis B. Mayer (1884–1957) American film producer, one of the founders of Metro-Goldwyn-Mayer
Bronislava Nijinska (1890–1972) ballerina and choreographer of the Ballets Russes, birthplace
Lee Harvey Oswald (1939–1963) assassin of US President John F Kennedy, resided in Minsk from January 1960 to June 1962
Grigoriy Plaskov (1898-1972) Soviet artillery lieutenant, birthplace
Alexander Rybak (born 1986), winner of the Eurovision Song Contest 2009 for Norway, birthplace
 Vitali Silitski (1972 – 2011), political scientist, analyst, the first director of the Belarusian Institute for Strategic Studies
 Aliaksiej Skoblia (nom de guerre Aliaksiej  "Tur") (1990 – 2022), Belarusian fighter-volunteer of the Kastuś Kalinoŭski Battalion posthumously awarded the title “Hero of Ukraine”
Vanda Skuratovich (1925–2010) Roman Catholic activist
Stanislav Shushkevich (1934 -2022), Belarusian politician and scientist, the first head of state of independent Belarus
 Stefaniya Stanyuta (1905 – 2000), theater and movie actress 
Alexander Taraikovsky (1986 – 2020) entrepreneur killed during the protests against the 2020 Belarusian presidential election
Barys Tasman (b. 1954), journalist, sports writer
George Tsisetski (b. 1985), film director, screenwriter, dramatist and visual artist
Rachel Wischnitzer (1885–1989) architect and art historian
Jazep Jucho (1921-2004), lawyer, historian and writer and a leading Belarusian authority on the laws of the Grand Duchy of Lithuania
Simcha Zorin (1902–1974) World War II partisan

Musicians

 Angelica Agurbash (born 1970), Belarusian singer, Eurovision participant 
Marina Gordon (1917–2013) soprano, birthplace
Irma Jaunzem (1897–1975), mezzo-soprano singer and folk song specialist
Boris Khaykin (1904–1978), conductor
Yung Lean (born 1996), Swedish rapper & musician, birthplace
 Źmicier Sidarovič (1965 – 2014), musician
Lavon Volski (b. 1965), musician

Sport 

Andrei Arlovski, grew up and lived in Minsk before moving to the US to fight in the Ultimate Fighting Championship
Victoria Azarenka, former World No. 1 tennis player and 2012 and 2013 Australian Open winner, born in Minsk moving to Arizona at 16
Yuri Bessmertny, kickboxer
Svetlana Boginskaya, gold medal-winning gymnast at the 1988 and 1992 Olympics, birthplace
Isaac Boleslavsky, chess grandmaster
Darya Domracheva, gold (4 times) and bronze medal-winning biathlete at the 2010 and 2014 Winter Olympics
Boris Gelfand (born 1968), Israeli chess Grandmaster
Max Geller (born 1971), Israeli Olympic wrestler
Alexei Ignashov, kickboxer, multiple Muay Thai and K-1 world champion
Oleg Karavayev, wrestler and Olympic champion
 Viktar Kuprejčyk (1949–2017), chess grandmaster
Isaak Mazel (1911-1945), chess master
Max Mirnyi, tennis player
Artsiom Parakhouski (born 1987), basketball player
Yulia Raskina, individual rhythmic gymnast, won the All-Around Silver at the 2000 Sydney Olympics
 Roman Rubinshteyn (born 1996), Belarusian-Israeli basketball player in the Israeli Basketball Premier League
Aryna Sabalenka, 2023 Australian Open winner, born in Minsk moving to Miami at 23
 Yegor Sharangovich (born 1998), ice hockey player
Yuri Shulman (born 1975), Belarusian-American chess grandmaster
Mark Slavin (1954-1972), Israeli Olympic Greco-Roman wrestler and victim of the Munich massacre at the 1972 Summer Olympics
Anna Smashnova (born 1976), Belarusian-born Israeli tennis player
Roman Sorkin (born 1996), Belarusian-born Israeli basketball player in the Israeli Basketball Premier League
Diana Vaisman (born 1998), Belarusian-born Israeli sprinter

Twin towns – sister cities

Minsk is twinned with:

 Abu Dhabi, United Arab Emirates (2007)
 Ankara, Turkey (2007)
 Bangalore, India (1986)
 Beijing, China (2016)
 Bishkek, Kyrgyzstan (1997)
 Bonn, Germany (1993)
 Changchun, China (1992)
 Chişinău, Moldova (2000)
 Detroit, United States (1979)
 Dushanbe, Tajikistan (1998)
 Eindhoven, Netherlands (1994)
 Gaziantep, Turkey (2018)
 Hanoi, Vietnam (2004)
 Havana, Cuba (2005)
 Ho Chi Minh City, Vietnam (2008)
 Islamabad, Pakistan (2015)
 Kaluga, Russia (2015)

 Murmansk, Russia (2014)
 Nizhny Novgorod, Russia (2017)
 Nottingham, England, UK (1986)
 Novosibirsk, Russia (2012)
 Rostov-on-Don, Russia (2018)
 Sendai, Japan (1973)
 Shanghai, China (2019)
 Shenzhen, China (2014)
 Tbilisi, Georgia (2015)
 Tehran, Iran (2006)
 Ufa, Russia (2017)
 Ulyanovsk, Russia (2015)

Significant depictions in popular culture
 In the Don Bluth animated film, An American Tail the protagonist Fievel Mousekewitz (voiced by Phillip Glasser) is told of a mythical being known as the "Giant Mouse of Minsk" in all his bedtime stories by his father (voiced by Nehemiah Persoff); in said stories, the powerful mouse was a giant who drove out both cats and Communist invaders. These stories would inspire him to take up the mantle as he rallies the other mice in New York to construct a huge mechanical mouse as a secret weapon to drive off the mafia cats who rule the city.
 Minsk is one of the starting towns of Lithuania in the turn-based strategy game Medieval II: Total War: Kingdoms.
 In the American sitcom Friends, recurring-character David "the Science Guy" (played by Hank Azaria) has a romance with Phoebe Buffay, one of the main characters, in the first season of the series, but breaks her heart when he decides to leave for Minsk on a three-year research trip. In the show, Minsk is incorrectly referred to as being located in Russia, despite taking place after the dissolution of the Soviet Union.
 In the science fiction franchise Star Trek, the Klingon character Worf is raised by human parents from Minsk, and spends some of his early life there. He regards it as one of his favorite places on Earth, and suggests that Chief Miles O'Brien move his family there.
 In Seinfeld there are repeated references to a film and later play titled "Rochelle, Rochelle" the subtitle is  "A young girl's strange, erotic journey from Milan to Minsk."

See also 
 The community Zabej
 List of squares in Minsk

References

Bibliography

Further reading

External links 

 A city guide for Minsk
 Minsk city on the official website of Belarus
 Why Minsk Is Not Like Other Capitals.
 Lost In Translation In Minsk – The "Real Belarus" Travel Tips.
  The Minsk Herald online magazine in English
 
 Photos of old Minsk
 Photos of Minsk during World War II

 
Capitals in Europe
Cities in Belarus
Magdeburg rights
Minsky Uyezd
Minsk Voivodeship
Polochans
Populated places established in the 11th century
Populated places in Minsk Region
Subdivisions of Belarus
1069 establishments in Europe